Mukli  is Headquarter of Thulung Dudhkoshi Rural Municipality, Ward No. 6 formerly a Village Development Committee in Solukhumbu District in the Sagarmatha Zone of north-eastern Nepal. At the time of the 1991 Nepal census it had a population of 2651 people living in 501 individual households.

There are inhabitant of Thulung Rai, Gurung, Chettri, Tamang and Dalit community people.

References

External links
UN map of the municipalities of Solukhumbu District

Populated places in Solukhumbu District